Hao Huang may refer to:
Hao Huang (pianist) (1957), American pianist and musicologist
Hao Huang (mathematician), mathematician
Hao Huang (entomologist), Chinese entomologist